Onisile was an Alaafin of the Yoruba Oyo Empire during the eighteenth century.

Onisile succeeded Amuniwaiye as ruler of the Oyo Empire. 

According to tradition, Onisile was both a great warrior and artistic. He reportedly had seven silver doors made to the seven entrances of his sleeping apartment.

Onsile's downfall reportedly came after he experimented with a plant (the 'sun leaf') that supposedly attracted lightning. He was struck by lightning and paralysed, leading the Oyo Mesi (the principal counselors of state) to reject him as ruler.

He was succeeded by Labisi.

References

Alaafins of Oyo
18th-century rulers in Africa
18th-century Nigerian people